is a passenger railway station  located in the town of Yurihama, Tōhaku District, Tottori Prefecture, Japan. It is operated by the West Japan Railway Company (JR West).

Lines

Station layout
The station consists of one ground-level side platform and one island platform connected by a  footbridge to the station building.  The station is unattended.

Platforms

History
Tomari Station opened on May 15, 1905. With the privatization of the Japan National Railways (JNR) on April 1, 1987, the station came under the aegis of the West Japan Railway Company. A new station building was completed in July 2022.

Passenger statistics
In fiscal 2018, the station was used by an average of 204 passengers daily.

Surrounding area
Yurihama Town Office Tomari Office

See also
List of railway stations in Japan

References

External links 

 Tomari Station from JR-Odekake.net 

Railway stations in Tottori Prefecture
Stations of West Japan Railway Company
Sanin Main Line
Railway stations in Japan opened in 1905
Yurihama, Tottori